Matthew Best (born 6 February 1957) is an English bass singer and conductor, especially of vocal music. He founded the ensemble Corydon Singers in 1973 and won the Kathleen Ferrier Award in 1981. From 1985, he was also a guest conductor of the English Chamber Orchestra. His recordings with Corydon Singers were made on the Hyperion Records label and focus on choral music by the likes of Anton Bruckner, Johannes Brahms and Felix Mendelssohn. He is currently engaged as Music Director of the Academy Choir Wimbledon and as a Principal Study singing teacher at the Royal Northern College of Music.

Discography 
Matthew Best founded Corydon Singers in 1973 which achieved recognition as one of the foremost choirs in Britain.  Indeed, in a light-hearted article in The Guardian in 2002 on the potential for a connection to exist between the quality of football fans' singing and their team's performance, David McKie wondered whether "Bolton could yet excel even Southampton if they cleared all their other supporters off the terraces and replaced them with the Corydon Singers".

Under Matthew Best's direction Corydon Singers released their first recording, in 1983, of Bruckner motets.  Their subsequent and numerous recordings, all for Hyperion Records and under Matthew Best's direction, earned the approval of the press in Britain, Europe, the United States, Japan and elsewhere. Matthew Best's 1990 recording with Corydon Singers of Ralph Vaughan Williams' Serenade to Music and other works was selected as Record of the Year by both the Guardian Newspaper and The Sunday Times, and was nominated for the Brit Awards. Their recording of Rachmaninov Vespers was chosen as the preferred version in BBC Radio 3's 'Building a Library' and their recording of Anton Bruckner's Te Deum and Mass in D minor was selected as one of the top releases of 1993 by the BBC's Record Review.

According to Hans Roelofs, Matthew Best is one of the better performers of Bruckner's religious music.

Matthew Best's recordings with performances of Bruckner's Requiem, Mass No. 2 (1882 version), and Psalms 114 and 112 and his CD devoted to Bruckner's motets and his performances of Masses Nos. 1 and 3, Aequali, Libera me (II), Te Deum and Psalm 150 are regarded as being among the better available recordings.

 Matthew Best, Corydon Singers, Bruckner: Motets - CD: Hyperion CDA66062, 1982
 Matthew Best, Corydon Singers, English Chamber Orchestra wind ensemble, Bruckner: Mass in E minor, Libera me, Zwei Aequale - CD: Hyperion CDA66177, 1985
 Matthew Best, Corydon Singers, English Chamber Orchestra, Bruckner: Requiem, Psalms 112 & 114 - CD: Hyperion CDA66245, 1987
 Matthew Best, Corydon Singers & Orchestra, Bruckner: Mass in F minor, Psalm 150 - CD: Hyperion CDA66599, 1992
 Matthew Best, Corydon Singers & Orchestra, Bruckner: Mass in D minor, Te Deum - CD: Hyperion CDA 66650, 1993

References

External links 
 
 
 Matthew Best (conductor) Hyperion Records
 Critical discography by Hans Roelofs of Bruckner's larger religious works 
 Critical discography by Hans Roelofs of Bruckner's smaller religious works 
 Academy Choir Wimbledon 

English conductors (music)
British male conductors (music)
English basses
1957 births
Living people
Place of birth missing (living people)
21st-century British conductors (music)
21st-century British male musicians